Alberto Da Rin (born 11 December 1939) is a retired Italian ice hockey player who competed at the 1964 Winter Olympics, alongside his elder brother Gianfranco. He played 8 games and scored 5 goals. His other two brothers Luigino and Arturo also played hockey.

References

External links
 

1939 births
Living people
Italian ice hockey centres
Olympic ice hockey players of Italy
Ice hockey players at the 1964 Winter Olympics
SG Cortina players